Joa Elfsberg (born 30 July 1979) is a Swedish retired ice hockey player. With the Swedish national team, she won a silver medal at the 2006 Winter Olympics and a bronze medal at the 2002 Winter Olympics.

References

External links
 

1979 births
Living people
People from Gävle Municipality
Ice hockey players at the 2002 Winter Olympics
Ice hockey players at the 2006 Winter Olympics
Olympic bronze medalists for Sweden
Olympic ice hockey players of Sweden
Olympic silver medalists for Sweden
Swedish women's ice hockey forwards
Olympic medalists in ice hockey
Medalists at the 2006 Winter Olympics
Medalists at the 2002 Winter Olympics
Ice hockey players at the 1998 Winter Olympics
Brynäs IF Dam players
Sportspeople from Gävleborg County